Isaac ben Baruch Albalia (Yiṣḥaq ben Barukh Albalia) 
(1035, Cordova – 1094, Granada) was an Andalusian Jewish mathematician, astronomer, astrologer, and Talmudist.

Biography
First educated by a Jew from Perigord, Albalia went on to the academy in Lucena, where he struck up a close friendship with Me'ir ibn Migash, father of Joseph ibn Migash, and then settled in Granada. When barely thirty years old Albalia began to write Kupat ha-Rokhlim ("The Peddler's Basket"), a commentary on the Talmud. He was a close friend of Samuel ha-Nagid, whose son Jehoseph ha-Nagid became Albalia's patron, to whom he dedicated his 1065 astronomical work Maḥberet Sod ha-Ibbur ("The Secret of Intercalation"), on the principles of the Jewish calendar. According to Moses ibn Ezra, Albalia was also a poet and rhetorician.

After the murder of Jehoseph ha-Nagid in the 1066 Granada massacre, Albalia fled to Cordova, where he became acquainted with then-prince Al-Mu'tamid ibn Abbad. When he ascended the throne of Seville in May 1069, Al-Mu'tamid appointed Albalia court astronomer and astrologer. At the age of thirty-one, just three years after he arrived in Seville, he was appointed leader (nasi) of the kingdom's Jewish community. Continuing as a palace official for twenty years, Albalia used his influence at court to improve the status of the Jews of the kingdom.

When in 1089 the recently arrived Almoravids imposed a purge of Jewish civil servants at the court of Seville, Albalia moved to Granada, where he spent the last five years of his life. Although he had strong disagreements with Isaac Alfasi, before his death he asked his son Baruch to go to Lucena and study with him. Alfasi adopted Baruch who eventually became a well-known scholar. Isaac Albalia was also the maternal grandfather of Abraham ibn Daud.

References

 

1035 births
1094 deaths
11th-century rabbis in al-Andalus
Medieval Jewish astrologers
Medieval Jewish astronomers
Medieval Jewish philosophers
Medieval Jewish scholars
Rabbis from Córdoba, Spain
Talmudists